Hunnasgiriya is a village in Sri Lanka. It is located within Central Province. Hunnasigiriya is one of the entering point to the Knuckles massif. It is in the southern part of the Knuckles Mountain Range. Majority of the living people is Tamil. Annual average rainfall is 2500mm and the average temperature is 22C.

See also
List of towns in Central Province, Sri Lanka

External links

Populated places in Kandy District